53rd National Board of Review Awards
December 15, 1981
The 53rd National Board of Review Awards were announced on December 15, 1981.

Top Ten Films 
Chariots of Fire, Reds
Atlantic City
Stevie
Gallipoli
On Golden Pond
Prince of the City
Raiders of the Lost Ark
Heartland
Ticket to Heaven
Breaker Morant

Top Foreign Films 
A Few Days from the Life of I. I. Oblomov
The Boat Is Full
The Last Metro

Pixote

Winners 
Best Film: Chariots of Fire, Reds
Best Foreign Film: A Few Days from the Life of I. I. Oblomov
Best Actor: Henry Fonda (On Golden Pond)
Best Actress: Glenda Jackson (Stevie)
Best Supporting Actor: Jack Nicholson (Reds)
Best Supporting Actress: Mona Washbourne (Stevie)
Best Director: Warren Beatty (Reds)
Career Achievement Award: James Cagney
Special Award: Blanche Sweet for her leadership of the National Board of Review; Kevin Brownlow, for the restoration of Napoléon

External links 
National Board of Review of Motion Pictures :: Awards for 1981

1981
1981 film awards
1981 in American cinema